Streptomyces thermogriseus is a thermophilic bacterium species from the genus of Streptomyces which has been isolated from a hot spring in Eryuan in the Yunnan Province in China.

See also 
 List of Streptomyces species

References

Further reading

External links
Type strain of Streptomyces thermogriseus at BacDive -  the Bacterial Diversity Metadatabase	

thermogriseus
Bacteria described in 1998